Maurea pellucida is a species of sea snail, a marine gastropod mollusk, in the family Calliostomatidae within the superfamily Trochoidea, the top snails, turban snails and their allies.

Description
The length of the shell attains 27 mm

Distribution
This marine species occurs off New Caledonia and New Zealand.

References

 Finlay, H.J. (1923). Some remarks on New Zealand Calliostomidae, with descriptions of new Tertiary species. Transactions of the New Zealand Institute. 54: 99-105.

External links
 Valenciennes A. (1846). Atlas de Zoologie. Mollusques. In: A. du Petit-Thouars, Voyage autour du monde sur la frégate la Venus pendant les années 1836–1839. 4 vols
 Philippi, R. A. (1846-1855). Die Kreiselschnecken oder Trochoideen (Gattungen Turbo, Trochus, Solarium, Rotella, Delphinula, Phasianella). In Abbildungen nach der Natur mit Beschreibungen. In: Küster, H. C.; Ed. Systematisches Conchylien Cabinet von Martini und Chemnitz. Zweiten Bandes, dritte Abtheilung. 2(3)

Calliostomatidae
Gastropods described in 1846